Oneness: Silver Dreams - Golden Reality is a 1979 album by Carlos Santana.  It was his second of three solo albums (the others being Illuminations and The Swing of Delight) to be released under his temporary Sanskrit name Devadip Carlos Santana, given to him by Sri Chinmoy. The album, which consists mostly of instrumental songs and ballads, features members of the band Santana, as well as Carlos Santana's first wife Deborah and father-in-law Saunders King. According to Santana, Oneness was influenced by Weather Report's album Mysterious Traveller. The track "Transformation Day" is an adaptation of part of Alan Hovhaness's symphonic work Mysterious Mountain.

Track listing

Personnel 
 Greg Walker – vocals (1, 11, 13)
 Deborah Santana – vocals (14)
 Carlos Santana – electric guitar, vocals
 Chris Solberg – guitar (5,11), Hammond organ (5, 11)
 Saunders King – guitar, vocals (7)
 Tom Coster – keyboards, vocals
 Narada Michael Walden – piano, Hammond organ (9, 15)
 Bob Levy – strings, synthesizer (6)
 Chris Rhyne – keyboards (11)
 David Margen – bass guitar
 Graham Lear – drums
 Pete Escovedo – timbales (6)
 Armando Peraza – percussion, vocals
 Clare Fischer – string arrangements and conductor; piano (7, 12)

External links 
 Carlos Santana  – Oneness: Silver Dreams - Golden Reality (1979) album releases & credits at Discogs.com
 Carlos Santana – Oneness: Silver Dreams - Golden Reality (1979) album review by William Ruhlmann, user reviews, credits, releases & Billboard chart at AllMusic.com

References 

"

1978 albums
Columbia Records albums
Carlos Santana albums
Albums produced by Carlos Santana